Seyyed Mohammad Amin Tabatabaei (born 5 February 2001) is an Iranian chess grandmaster (2018).

Chess career
Born in 2001, Tabatabaei earned his international master (IM) title in 2015 and was awarded his grandmaster (GM) title by FIDE in April 2018. In February 2018, he participated in the Aeroflot Open. He finished seventeenth out of ninety-two, scoring 5½/9 (+5–3=1), earning an additional GM norm in the process. 

Tabatabaei competed in the Asian Chess Championship in December 2018. He finished second on 6½/9 (+4–0=5), and thus qualified for the Chess World Cup 2019. He won the Biel Masters in July 2019 with 7/9 (+6–1=2) and Josef Kupper Memorial in August 2019 with 6/7 (+5–0=2). At the Chess World Cup in September, he defeated Bassem Amin in the first round, then was eliminated by Jeffery Xiong in the second round.

He qualified again for the Chess World Cup 2021 where, ranked 86th, he eliminated Basheer Al Qudaimi 2.5-1.5 in the first round, Ferenc Berkes by the same score in the second round, 22nd-seed Yu Yangyi 1.5-0.5 in the third round, 11th-seed Pentala Harikrishna 1.5-0.5 in the fourth round, and Haik M. Martirosyan 2.5-1.5 in the fifth round, before losing to Vladimir Fedoseev 0.5-1.5 in the quarter-final. By reaching the quarter-finals, he secured a place in the FIDE Grand Prix 2022 tournament.

Through February and March 2022, Tabatabaei played in the FIDE Grand Prix 2022. In the second leg, he tied for second with Nikita Vitiugov in Pool B with a 3/6 result. In the third leg, he won his pool with a 3.5/6 result, advancing to the semifinals to face Wesley So and ultimately earning sixth place in the tournament series overall.

In December 2022, Tabatabaei won 3rd place in the 2022 Chessable Sunway Sitges Chess Festival after losing armageddon in 2nd place playoffs to Hans Niemann.

References

External links
 
 
  

2001 births
Living people
Chess grandmasters
Iranian chess players
Sportspeople from Tehran